La Hogue is an unincorporated community in Douglas Township, Iroquois County, Illinois, United States.

Geography

References

Unincorporated communities in Illinois
Unincorporated communities in Iroquois County, Illinois